Phymatodes is a genus of beetles in the family Cerambycidae, containing the following species:

 Phymatodes aeneus LeConte, 1854
 Phymatodes aereus (Newman, 1838)
 Phymatodes amoenus (Say, 1824)
 Phymatodes ater LeConte, 1884
 Phymatodes blandus (LeConte, 1859)
 Phymatodes concolor Linsley, 1934
 Phymatodes decussatus (LeConte, 1857)
 Phymatodes dimidiatus (Kirby in Richardson, 1837)
 Phymatodes fulgidus Hopping, 1928
 Phymatodes grandis Casey, 1912
 Phymatodes hirtellus (LeConte, 1873)
 Phymatodes infuscatus (LeConte, 1859)
 Phymatodes lengi Joutel, 1911
 Phymatodes maculicollis LeConte, 1878
 Phymatodes nigerrimus Van Dyke, 1920
 Phymatodes nigrescens Hardy & Preece, 1927
 Phymatodes nitidus LeConte, 1874
 Phymatodes obliquus Casey, 1891
 Phymatodes rainieri Van Dyke, 1937
 Phymatodes shareeae Cope, 1984
 Phymatodes testaceus (Linnaeus, 1758)
 Phymatodes tysoni Chemsak & Linsley, 1984
 Phymatodes varius (Fabricius, 1776)
 Phymatodes vilitatis Linsley, 1940
 Phymatodes vulneratus (LeConte, 1857)

References

 
Callidiini